Dowry Square is in the Hotwells area of Bristol.

It was laid out in 1727 by George Tully and building continued until 1750. The houses are three-storeyed with attics, simply detailed and with channelled pilasters to the party walls.

In 1799 Dr Thomas Beddoes opened a laboratory in Dowry Square as the Pneumatic Institution where he worked with Sir Humphry Davy.

Architecture 
Many of the buildings have been designated by English Heritage as grade II* or II listed buildings.
 No 1 (grade II) 
 No 2 (grade II) 
 No 3 (grade II) 
 No 4 (grade II*) 
 No 5 (grade II) 
 No 6 (grade II*) 
 No 8 (grade II) 
 No 9 (grade II*) 
 No 7 (grade II*) 
 No 10 (grade II*) 
 No 11 (grade II*) 
 No 12 (grade II*) 
 No 13 (grade II) 
 Nos 14&15 (grade II) 
 No 16 York House (grade II) 
 K6 Telephone Kiosk (grade II) 
  Plinth and railings around Dowry Square gardens (grade II)

References 

Grade II listed buildings in Bristol
Grade II* listed buildings in Bristol
1727 establishments in England
Squares in Bristol
Georgian architecture in Bristol